The Regimental Military Intelligence Battalion, 75th Ranger Regiment is a combat support unit of the United States Army's 75th Ranger Regiment, providing intelligence, surveillance, reconnaissance, cyber, and electronic warfare capabilities. The battalion consists of three primary elements based at Fort Benning, Georgia; a headquarters company, a military intelligence company, and a cyber/electromagnetic activities company.

The battalion was formed as a provisional unit 22 May 2017, and became a permanent enduring part of the Regiment 16 June 2020.

History 
The battalion’s mission is to recruit, train, develop, and employ highly trained and specialized Rangers to conduct full spectrum intelligence, surveillance, reconnaissance, cyber, and electronic warfare operations in order to enhance the Regimental Commander’s situational awareness and inform his decision-making process. Presently, the RMIB consists of a headquarters detachment and two companies.

The staff and command group are embedded within the Headquarters and Headquarters Detachment. It leads the Regiment’s recruitment and management of intelligence Rangers, synchronizes intelligence training and operations across the Regiment and with other special operations and conventional forces, and also provides intelligence support to the Regimental staff.

The Military Intelligence Company possesses a diverse mix of capabilities which include all-source analysts, geospatial analysts, human intelligence collectors, counterintelligence agents, and unmanned aerial systems. This enables the company to conduct multi-discipline collection and production, expeditionary imagery collection and processing, exploitation, and dissemination of raw data, and all-source analysis, to further enable the Regiment’s training and operations.

The Cyber Electromagnetic Activities Company integrates and synchronizes cyber, electronic warfare, signals intelligence, and technical surveillance in support of the Regimental Commander’s objectives. The CEMA Company represents a new approach in line with the Army’s intent of fielding a modernized force capable of operations on any front. The multi-domain concept provides a non-linear approach where all events can occur across the environment at any time. CEMA places emphasis on innovation, technological advancement and electronic pursuit to support real time operations against any threat, digital or otherwise.

Organization

Military Intelligence Company 
The Military Intelligence Company possesses a diverse mix of capabilities which include all-source analysts, geospatial analysts, human intelligence collectors, counterintelligence agents, and unmanned aerial systems. This enables the company to conduct multi-discipline collection and production, expeditionary imagery collection and ‘PED’ (processing, exploitation, and dissemination) of raw data, and all-source analysis, to further enable the Regiment’s training and operations.

Cyber Electromagnetic Activities Company 
The Cyber Electromagnetic Activities (CEMA) Company integrates and synchronizes cyber, electronic warfare, signals intelligence (SIGINT), and technical surveillance in support of the Regimental Commander’s objectives. The CEMA Company represents a new approach in line with the Army’s intent of fielding a modernized force capable of operations on any front. The multi-domain concept provides a non-linear approach where all events can occur across the environment at any time. CEMA places emphasis on innovation, technological advancement, and electronic pursuit to support real time operations against any threat, digital or otherwise.

List of commanders

References 

Battalions of the United States Army
Military units and formations of the United States Army
Military intelligence units and formations of the United States Army
Units and formations of the United States in the War in Afghanistan (2001–2021)
Military units and formations established in 2017
Military units and formations in Georgia (U.S. state)
Organizations based in Georgia (U.S. state)